This is a list of Australian Asia Pacific Screen Awards winners and nominees. This list details the performances of Australian actors, actresses, and films that have either been submitted or nominated for, or have won, an Asia Pacific Screen Award.

Awards and nominations

Nominations – 35
Wins – 8
Special Mention – 3

See also
 List of Australian submissions for the Academy Award for Best International Feature Film

References

External links
 Nominees and winners at the Asia Pacific Screen Awards website

Australia
Asia Pacific Screen Awards
Asia Pacific Screen Awards